Muriel van Schilfgaarde (born 10 May 1968) is a Dutch rower. She competed in the women's eight event at the 1996 Summer Olympics.

References

1968 births
Living people
Dutch female rowers
Olympic rowers of the Netherlands
Rowers at the 1996 Summer Olympics
Sportspeople from Utrecht (province)